Hus is a surname. Notable people with the surname include:

 Jan Hus (–1415), Czech Catholic priest, philosopher, reformer, and master at Charles University in Prague; burned at the stake for heresy
 Charles Hus, dit Millet (1738–1802), political figure in Lower Canada
 Eugène Hus (1758–1823), born Pierre-Louis Stapleton, Franco-Belgian ballet dancer and choreographer
 Jean-Baptiste Hus (1736–1805), French ballet dancer and ballet master
 Tim Hus, Canadian country-folk singer
 Walter Hus (born 1959), Belgian composer and musician

See also
 Hus family, an 18th-century French dynasty of ballet dancers and actors